Vsevolod Vyacheslavovich Ivanov (– 15 August 1963) was a Soviet and Russian writer, dramatist, journalist and war correspondent.

Biography
Ivanov was born in what is now Northern Kazakhstan to a teacher's family. When he was a child, Vsevolod ran away to become a clown in a traveling circus. His first story, published in 1915, caught the attention of Maxim Gorky, who advised Vsevolod throughout his career.

Ivanov joined the Red Army during the Civil War and fought in Siberia. This inspired his short stories, Partisans (1921) and Armoured Train (1922). Partisans was published in the first edition of the journal Krasnaya Nov, whose editor, Aleksandr Voronsky, saw Ivanov as the most important writer to emerge since the revolution because of his 'joyfulness' and his evocation of a world "where everything is suffused with powerful, primitive vitality ... people, like the nature surrounding them, are pristinely whole and healthy."

In 1922 Ivanov joined the literary group Serapion Brothers. Other members included Nikolai Tikhonov, Mikhail Zoshchenko, Viktor Shklovsky, Veniamin Kaverin and Konstantin Fedin. His first novels, Colored Winds (1922) and Azure Sands (1923), were set in Asiatic part of Russia and gave rise to the genre of ostern in Soviet literature. In the early 1920s, he was one of the most popular writers in the Soviet Union. Thirteen of his short stories and three longer works were published in Krasnaya Nov during Voronsky's editorship - more than any other writer's. His novella Baby was acclaimed by Edmund Wilson as the finest Soviet short story ever.

In 1927 Ivanov rewrote his short story, the Armoured Train 14-69 into a play. Produced by the Moscow Art Theatre, it was that theatre's 'first production of a strictly Soviet topic', in which the Bolsheviks' enemies were portrayed as whining caricatures, prompting speculation that the head of the MAT, Konstantin Stanislavski had put it on to please the regime and make amends for having produced The Days of the Turbins by Mikhail Bulgakov, with its vivid and sympathetic portrayal of White Russian army officers. The play was acclaimed by communist critics, and singled out for praise by Joseph Stalin, who told a writers' meeting in February 1929: "He's not a communist, Vsevolod Ivanov ... but that hasn't kept him from writing a good piece that has great revolutionary significance. Its educational significance is indisputable."

But from the late 1920s, Ivanov began to drink heavily and write less, and in the opinion of at least one critic "nothing he did in the last four decades of his life matched, in quality or in influence, what he had written in those six years" (to 1927)

Later, Ivanov came under fire from Communist critics who claimed his works were too pessimistic and that it was not clear whether the Reds or Whites were the heroes.

He wrote two novels in the 1930s, Adventures of a Fakir (1935) and Parkhomenko (1938). During the Second World War, Ivanov worked as a war correspondent for Izvestia. During the Great Purge, he declared his "creative hatred" for those accused of being enemies of the people, provoking Leon Trotsky, who had previously praised Ivanov's work, to describe him as a 'miniature Gorky' - "Not a prostitute by nature, he preferred to remain quiet as long as possible but the time came when silence meant civil and perhaps physical annihilation: it is not a 'creative hatred' that guides the pen of these writers but paralysing fear." His last novel was The Taking of Berlin (1945). In 1953, he published some reminiscences, Encounters with Maxim Gorky His final work consisted of travel notes, published just before his death.

Family 
Vsevolod's son Vyacheslav Ivanov became one of the leading philologists and Indo-Europeanists of the late 20th century. Vsevolod adopted Isaac Babel's illegitimate child Emmanuil when he married Babel's one-time mistress Tamara Kashirina. Emmanuil's name was changed to "Mikhail Ivanov" and he later became a noted artist.

English translations
Armoured Train 14-69, International publishers, 1933.
The Adventures of a Fakir, Vanguard Press, 1935.
Armored Train 14-69, Trilogy Books, 1978.
Selected Stories, Raduga Publishers, 1983.
From the Reminiscences of Private Ivanov and Other Stories, Angel Books, 1988.The Child, from Great Soviet Short Stories, Dell, 1990.Fertility and Other Stories'', Northwestern University Press, 1998.

References

External links
 

1895 births
1963 deaths
20th-century Russian dramatists and playwrights
20th-century Russian male writers
20th-century Russian short story writers
Journalists from the Russian Empire
Male writers from the Russian Empire
People from Pavlodar Region
People from Semipalatinsk Oblast
Recipients of the Order of the Red Banner of Labour
Socialist realism writers
Socialist Revolutionary Party politicians
Russian male dramatists and playwrights
Russian male journalists
Russian male novelists
Russian male short story writers
Russian male writers
Russian war correspondents
Soviet dramatists and playwrights
Soviet journalists
Soviet male writers
Soviet military personnel of the Russian Civil War
Soviet novelists
Soviet short story writers
Soviet war correspondents
Deaths from kidney cancer
Burials at Novodevichy Cemetery